Johnny Holton Jr. (born August 22, 1991) is an American football wide receiver who is a free agent. He played college football at Cincinnati and was signed by the Oakland Raiders as an undrafted free agent in 2016. He has also played for the Philadelphia Eagles, Pittsburgh Steelers, and New York Giants.

College career
Holton was recruited to play junior college football at the College of Dupage. There, Holton excelled on the field at wide receiver over his two years at the school. After his time there, he had offers from the University of Alabama, Florida State University, Ohio State University, TSU and Auburn but he chose Cincinnati to continue his college career.

Professional career

Oakland Raiders
On May 10, 2016, Holton signed with the Oakland Raiders as an undrafted free agent following the conclusion of the 2016 NFL Draft. He played in 15 games his rookie season, recording two receptions for 34 yards while playing regular role on special teams, recording 12 tackles, good for second on the team.

On September 3, 2018, Holton was waived by the Raiders and was later re-signed to the practice squad, with his position being changed from wide receiver to cornerback. He was promoted to the active roster on November 21, 2018 as a wide receiver. He was waived on November 26, 2018 and re-signed to the practice squad.

Philadelphia Eagles
On January 15, 2019, Holton signed a reserve/future contract with the Philadelphia Eagles. He was waived on May 8, 2019.

Pittsburgh Steelers

On May 13, 2019, Holton signed with the Pittsburgh Steelers. He was waived on August 31, 2019 and was signed to the practice squad the next day. He was promoted to the active roster on September 7, 2019.

The Steelers released Holton on March 16, 2020.

New York Giants 
Holton was signed by the New York Giants on September 2, 2020. He was released on September 5, 2020, and signed to the practice squad the next day. He was elevated to the active roster on September 26 for the team's week 3 game against the San Francisco 49ers, and reverted to the practice squad after the game on September 28. He was released on October 5, 2020.

References

External links
Cincinnati Bearcats bio
Oakland Raiders bio

1991 births
Living people
American football return specialists
American football wide receivers
Cincinnati Bearcats football players
New York Giants players
Oakland Raiders players
Philadelphia Eagles players
Pittsburgh Steelers players
Players of American football from Miami